KQOD (100.1 FM) is a commercial radio station in Stockton, California. It carries an Rhythmic AC-leaning Classic hip hop radio format, and is owned by iHeartMedia, Inc.  Its studios and offices are on Lancey Drive in Modesto.

KQOD has an effective radiated power (ERP) of 6,000 watts.  The transmitter is on Arata Road in Stockton.  KQOD broadcasts in the HD Radio hybrid format.  Its HD2 subchannel formerly carried a rhythmic contemporary dance music format known as "Club Jam."

History
On January 24, 1980, the station first signed on as KFMR.  It was owned by Carson Communications and aired an easy listening country music format.

On November 23, 1994, it changed its call letters to KQOD.  It aired an oldies music format.

In 1999, the station was acquired by San Antonio-based Clear Channel Communications, the forerunner to today's iHeartMedia, Inc.

References

External links

QOD
Radio stations established in 1994
Classic hip hop radio stations in the United States
IHeartMedia radio stations
1994 establishments in California